Svetlana Kaspolatovna Tsarukaeva (born 25 December 1987) is a Russian weightlifter.

Career 
She won the 2006 Women's Junior World Championships in the 58 kg category, with a total of 231 kg.

Tsarukaeva participated in the women's -58 kg category at the 2006 World Weightlifting Championships and won the silver medal, finishing behind Qiu Hongmei. She snatched 108 kg and clean and jerked an additional 125 kg for a total of 233 kg, 4 kg behind winner Qiu.

At the 2007 World Weightlifting Championships she won the silver medal in the 63 kg category, with a total of 250 kg.

Tsarukaeva entered the 2008 Summer Olympics as the favourite for the 63 kg event.

Tsarukaeva was initially awarded a silver medal at the 2012 Summer Olympics in the Women's 63 kg event. However, on 27 July 2016, the IWF reported that, in the IOC's second wave of re-sampling for doping violations at the 2012 Summer Olympics, Tsarukayeva had tested positive for the steroid dehydrochlormethyltestosterone. If confirmed, she would be stripped of the Olympic medal. The IWF has provisionally suspended her.  On 5 April 2017 it was announced that as a result of retesting samples she had been disqualified from the 2012 Olympics for a drug violation, and her silver medal withdrawn.

Achievements 
 2006 World Weightlifting Championships, -58 kg
 2007 World Weightlifting Championships, -63 kg

References

External links 
 Athlete Biography at beijing2008

Living people
1987 births
People from Vladikavkaz
Russian female weightlifters
Weightlifters at the 2008 Summer Olympics
Weightlifters at the 2012 Summer Olympics
World record holders in Olympic weightlifting
Olympic weightlifters of Russia
Olympic silver medalists for Russia
World Weightlifting Championships medalists
Competitors stripped of Summer Olympics medals
Doping cases in weightlifting
Russian sportspeople in doping cases
European Weightlifting Championships medalists
20th-century Russian women
21st-century Russian women